Francis Hallé (born 15 April 1938) is a French botanist and biologist. He is a specialist on tropical rainforests and of tree architecture. He is best known for the first "Radeau des cimes" ("Navigating the peaks") he initiated with an aerostatic balloon in 1986. He is a Professor Emeritus of the University of Montpellier.

In 2010, he and Luc Jacquet started to collaborate for a Wild-Touch film project, La Forêt des pluies, a documentary about primary forests.

References

External links 
SNACK 3: I am a Tree / Workshop with Francis Hallé and Peter Del Tredici Essays by Hanna Barefoot and Lucy McFadden. Drawings by Katherine Cannella, Amanda Coen, Jennifer Livingston, Matthew Scarnaty, and Rachel Vassar. Photos by Leena Cho and Brian Osborn

20th-century French botanists
1938 births
Living people
21st-century French botanists